Dương Đình Nghệ (Chữ Hán: 楊廷藝; pinyin: Yáng Tíngyì; 874 – March 937; some sources record Dương Diên Nghệ, Chữ Hán: 楊延藝) was the  jiedushi of Tĩnh Hải quân in around 931 AD.

He was a skillful, talented general under Khúc Hạo, descendant of the Khúc clan who ruled Vietnam autonomously while it was technically under Chinese control for three generations. He cornered the Southern Han garrison inside Đại La and defeated their relief force, afterwards establishing himself as jiedushi. Dương Đình Nghệ was killed eventually by his general Kiều Công Tiễn who then moved up to the post of governor/administrator. This brief void left the region without rulers, until Kiều fled and Dương's son-in-law Ngô Quyền established the Ngô dynasty in 939.

References

|-

|-

Southern Han jiedushi of Jinghai Circuit
937 deaths
10th century in Vietnam
10th-century Vietnamese monarchs
Five Dynasties and Ten Kingdoms